NDAS can refer to:
 Network Direct Attached Storage, a computer network disk access protocol
 National Democratic Action Society, a political party in Bahrain